Propellants, Explosives and Rocket Motor Establishment, usually known for brevity as PERME, operated at two sites:
 Waltham Abbey Royal Gunpowder Mills, known from 1977 as PERME Waltham Abbey
 Rocket Propulsion Establishment established at RAF Westcott in 1946, also known as PERME Westcott
 RAF Spadeadam, also known as the Rocket Establishment was not officially part of PERME but was often confused with it.

Research institutes in England
Rocket engines of the United Kingdom
Rocketry